Tecoma rosifolia is a species of flowering plant native to Peru. It is thought to be closely related to T. tenuiflora, and hybridizes with T. stans.

References

rosifolia
Flora of South America